Alec David Edward Muffett (born April 22, 1968) is an Anglo-American internet security evangelist, architect, and software engineer. His work includes Crack, the original Unix password cracker, and for the CrackLib password-integrity testing library.; He is active in the open-source software community.

Career 
Muffett joined Sun Microsystems in 1992, working initially as a systems administrator. He rose through the ranks to become the principal engineer for security, a position which he held until he was retrenched, with many others, in 2009 (shortly before Oracle acquired Sun). While at Sun he was one of the researchers who worked on the factorization of the 512 bit RSA Challenge Number; RSA-155 was successfully factorized in August 1999.  Muffett also worked on the Sun MD5 hash algorithm, which was introduced in Solaris 9 update 2. The new algorithm drew on Muffett's work in pluggable crypt, and has been implemented in many different languages, for example Python.

In 2015, Muffett was named as one of the top six influential security thinkers by SC Magazine. In October of that year he co-authored RFC 7686 "The '.onion' Special-Use Domain Name", with Jacob Applebaum.

More recently, Muffett assisted the New York Times with the creation of their own Tor onion site. Following that he created a temporary Onion Wikipedia site, accessible only over Tor, and assisted building further onion sites for
BBC News, Brave and The Guardian.

References

External links
 Personal blog
 Factorization of a 512 Bit RSA Modulus
 Crypticide I: Thirteen Years of Crack

Computer security specialists
1968 births
Living people
Alumni of University College London
Place of birth missing (living people)
American software engineers
British software engineers
Sun Microsystems people
InfoSec Twitter